This is a list of transfers in Dutch football for the 2009 summer transfer window. Only moves featuring an Eredivisie side and/or an Eerste Divisie side are listed.

Eredivisie

ADO Den Haag

In:

Out:

]

AFC Ajax

In:

 

Out:

AZ

In:

Out:

Feyenoord

In:

Out:

FC Groningen

In:

Out:

SC Heerenveen

In:

Out:

Heracles Almelo

In:

Out:

NAC Breda

In:

Out:

NEC

In:

Out:

PSV

In:

Out:

RKC Waalwijk

In:

Out:

Roda JC

In:

Out:

Sparta Rotterdam

In:

Out:

FC Twente

In:

Out:

FC Utrecht

In:

Out:

Vitesse

In:

Out:

VVV Venlo

In:

Out:

Willem II

In:

Out:

Eerste Divisie

AGOVV Apeldoorn

In:

 
 

Out:

SC Cambuur

In:

Out:

FC Den Bosch

In:

Out:

FC Dordrecht

In:

Out:

FC Eindhoven

In:

Out:

FC Emmen

In:

Out:

Excelsior

In:

Out:

Fortuna Sittard

In:

Out:

Go Ahead Eagles

In:

Out:

De Graafschap

In:

Out:

HFC Haarlem

In:

Out:

Helmond Sport

In:

Out:

MVV

In:

Out:

FC Omniworld

In:

Out:

RBC Roosendaal

In:

Out:

Telstar

In:

Out:

FC Oss

In:

Out:

BV Veendam

In:

 

Out:

FC Volendam

In:

Out:

FC Zwolle

In:

Out:

See also
 Football in the Netherlands
 Transfer window
 List of Dutch football transfers summer 2010–11

References

Transfers Summer 2009
2009
Netherlands